Byron Lee Tunnell (born October 30, 1960) is an American professional baseball coach and retired player. He played as a pitcher in Major League Baseball (MLB) and Nippon Professional Baseball. He was the bullpen coach for the Milwaukee Brewers of MLB.

Early life
Tunnell graduated from Anderson High School in Austin, Texas, and then attended Baylor University in Waco, Texas, where he was a star pitcher on the Bears team from 1979 to 1981.

Career

In 483 innings pitched in 132 games, Tunnell committed only one error in 122 total chances (33 putouts, 88 assists) for a stellar .992 fielding percentage.

He also pitched three seasons in Nippon Professional Baseball, from  until , for the Fukuoka Daiei Hawks.

In July 2012, he was named interim bullpen coach of the Milwaukee Brewers, a position he held until 2018, when his contract was not renewed by the Brewers front office.

References

External links

1960 births
Living people
American expatriate baseball players in Japan
Baseball players from Texas
Buffalo Bisons (minor league) players
Cincinnati Reds coaches
Colorado Springs Sky Sox players
Gulf Coast Pirates players
Fukuoka Daiei Hawks players
Hawaii Islanders players
Louisville Redbirds players
Major League Baseball bullpen coaches
Major League Baseball pitchers
Milwaukee Brewers coaches
Minnesota Twins players
New Haven Ravens players
Pittsburgh Pirates players
Portland Beavers players
St. Louis Cardinals players
Springfield Cardinals players
Toledo Mud Hens players
Tucson Toros players
Sportspeople from Tyler, Texas